Demokrat Parti may refer to:

 Democratic Party (Northern Cyprus)
 Democrat Party (Turkey, current)
 Democratic Party (Turkey, historical)

See also
 Democrat (disambiguation)
 Democrat Party (disambiguation)
 Partai Demokrat (Indonesia)